The Silence of Joan is a 2011 French historical film directed by Philippe Ramos and starring Clémence Poésy, Thierry Frémont and Liam Cunningham. The film was screened in the Directors' Fortnight at the 2011 Cannes Film Festival.

Plot
The film depicts the period between Joan of Arc's capture and her execution in 1431.

Cast
 Clémence Poésy as Jeanne d'Arc
 Thierry Frémont as The healer
 Liam Cunningham as English Captain
 Mathieu Amalric as The preacher
 Louis-Do de Lencquesaing as Jean de Luxembourg
 Jean-François Stévenin as The monk
 Johan Leysen as The commander of the guard	
 Bernard Blancan as The carpenter

See also
 The Passion of Joan of Arc, 1928 film
 Cultural depictions of Joan of Arc

References

External links
 

2011 films
2010s historical drama films
2010s French-language films
French historical drama films
Films directed by Philippe Ramos
Films set in France
Films set in the 1430s
Films about Joan of Arc
2011 drama films
2010s French films